Juan Queipo de Llano y Valdés (1635–1713) was a Roman Catholic prelate who served as Archbishop of La Plata o Charcas (1680–1694) and Bishop of La Paz (1694–1713).

Biography
Juan Queipo de Llano y Valdés was born in Santianes de Tuña, Spain in 1635.
On 23 Sep 1680, he was appointed during the papacy of Pope Innocent XI as Bishop of La Paz.
On 21 Dec 1681, he was consecrated bishop by Melchor de Liñán y Cisneros, Archbishop of Lima. 
On 19 Apr 1694, he was appointed during the papacy of Pope Innocent XII as Archbishop of La Plata o Charcas.
He served as Archbishop of La Plata o Charcas until his death in 1713.

While bishop, he was the principal consecrator of Bartolomé González y Poveda, Archbishop of La Plata o Charcas (1686); and Luis Francisco Romero, Bishop of Santiago de Chile (1707).

References

External links and additional sources
 (for Chronology of Bishops) 
 (for Chronology of Bishops) 
 (for Chronology of Bishops) 
 (for Chronology of Bishops) 

16th-century Roman Catholic bishops in Bolivia
17th-century Roman Catholic bishops in Bolivia
Bishops appointed by Pope Innocent XI
Bishops appointed by Pope Innocent XII
People from Oviedo
1635 births
1713 deaths
Roman Catholic archbishops of Sucre
Roman Catholic bishops of La Paz